Mogochinsky District is an administrative and municipal district (raion), one of the thirty-one in Zabaykalsky Krai, Russia. It is located in the east of the krai and borders China in the east and south. Its administrative center is the town of Mogocha. As of the 2010 Census, the total population of the district was 25,508, with the population of Mogocha accounting for 52.0% of that number.

History
The district was established on January 4, 1926.

Geography 
The northern part of the district is located in the Olyokma-Stanovik Highlands area. The Amazar, one of the tributaries of the Amur, flows across it.

References

Notes

Sources

Districts of Zabaykalsky Krai
States and territories established in 1926
